Bjørn Ole Gleditsch (born 13 January 1963) is a Norwegian businessperson and politician for the Conservative Party.

Since 2003 he is the mayor of Sandefjord. Before this he served several terms in the municipal council.

Gleditsch  is the richest mayor of any municipality of Norway. The grandson of Odd Gleditsch, he is an heir of the paint company Jotun. Through shareholding, he has a fortune of NOK 480 million, approximately 86.9 million U.S. dollars.

He is also a member of the board of Sandefjord Airport, Torp.

References 

1963 births
Living people
Conservative Party (Norway) politicians
Mayors of places in Vestfold
Norwegian businesspeople
People from Sandefjord